The Caribbean Series (Spanish: Serie del Caribe), also called Caribbean World Series, is the highest tournament for professional baseball teams in Latin America. The tournament location is rotated annually among the countries and is normally played in February after all of the leagues have ended their national tournaments.

History
The competition was the brainchild of Venezuelan baseball entrepreneur Pablo Morales and Oscar Prieto Ortiz, his business partner since 1936, who devised the idea after seeing the success of the now extinct Serie Interamericana in 1946, which featured the clubs Brooklyn Bushwicks from the United States, Cervecería Caracas from Venezuela, Sultanes de Monterrey from Mexico, and an All-Star team composed of Cuban players.

Inspired by the Serie Interamericana and his experience as a former president of the International Baseball Federation, Morales joined Prieto and presented the idea to baseball representatives of Cuba, Panama, and Puerto Rico during a meeting held in Havana on August 21, 1948. The representatives then agreed to stage a four-country, round-robin tournament 12-game to be known as the Serie del Caribe, to be launched in Cuba from February 20–25 of 1949.

The Series ran annually from 1949 through 1960, with Cuba winning seven times. However, the event was cancelled after Fidel Castro dissolved all professional baseball in Cuba in 1961. It was not until 1970 that the Caribbean Series was revived. Moreover, the 1981 Caribbean Series was not held due to a Venezuelan League player's strike.

The tournament featured the champions of the Dominican Republic, Mexico, Puerto Rico, and Venezuela for over 40 years. Cuba returned in 2014. Panama returned to host the 2019 edition. Colombia was added for the 2020 edition, replacing Cuba who could not participate due to visa issues. Curaçao was invited as a guest in 2023.

Leagues participating

Series

Championship games 
Starting with the 2013 Caribbean Series, a championship game was introduced where the two teams with the best win–loss record from the round-robin first stage would meet to determine the champion. In 2013 the first round consisted of 12 games and each team faced the other teams twice, one as home club and the other as an away team; from 2014 on, with the return of Cuban teams to the tournament, the first stage was changed to a round robin of 10 games where each team faced the other teams once.

Championships by team

Championships by country

Undefeated teams

See also
List of baseball players who have played in the Caribbean Series
Caribbean Baseball Hall of Fame
Caribbean Series MVPs
Latin American Series
Asia Series
European Cup
Caribbean Series Awards

Notes

Sources
Antero Núñez, José. Series del Caribe. Jefferson, Caracas, Venezuela: Impresos Urbina, C.A., 1987.
Gutiérrez, Daniel. Enciclopedia del Béisbol en Venezuela – 1895–2006.  Caracas, Venezuela: Impresión Arte, C.A., 2007.

External links

Béisbol en Cuba (Spanish)
Cuban Teams in the Caribbean Series
Historia de las Series del Caribe (Spanish)
Las Series del Caribe (Spanish)
Sobre el Diamante (Spanish)

 
International baseball competitions in the Caribbean
Recurring sporting events established in 1949